Nazar Stasyshyn (born 5 August 1997 in Ukraine) is a professional Ukrainian footballer, who plays as a defender.

Career
Stasyshyn is a product of the Skala Stryi Sportive School System.

He spent a half-season as a player in the Ukrainian First League for FC Skala, and in February 2017 signed a contract with the Ukrainian Premier League's FC Karpaty Lviv.

References

External links
Statistics at FFU website (Ukr)

1997 births
Living people
Ukrainian footballers
FC Karpaty Lviv players
FC Skala Stryi (2004) players
FC Volyn Lutsk players
FC Ahrobiznes Volochysk players
Ukrainian Premier League players

Association football defenders